URB or Urb may refer to:
Urb (surname), an Estonian language surname
 URB (magazine), an American magazine focused on music and urban culture
 United Remnant Band of the Shawnee Nation, a band of Native Americans who hold that they are descended from the Shawnee
 University Radio Bath, student radio station for the University of Bath, England.

 Union of Russia and Belarus or Union State 
 University Radio Bailrigg, former name of Bailrigg FM
Urb., taxonomic author abbreviation of Ignatz Urban (1848–1931), German botanist